R. S. Arumugam was an Indian politician and former Member of the Legislative Assembly. He was elected to the Tamil Nadu legislative assembly as an Indian National Congress candidate from Tirunelveli constituency in 1952 election. He was one of the victors from the constituency, the other being Somayajulu.

References 

Indian National Congress politicians from Tamil Nadu
Year of birth missing (living people)
Living people
People from Tirunelveli district
Madras MLAs 1952–1957